Gypsy Man is an album by saxophonist Robin Kenyatta released on the Atlantic label in 1973.

Reception

In his review for Allmusic, Thom Jurek stated "Gypsy Man stands out mightily as one of the great jazz-funk outings of the '70s; it is an all but forgotten jazz classic".

Track listing 
All compositions by Robin Kenyatta except as indicated
 "Last Tango in Paris" (Gato Barbieri) – 4:50
 "Another Freight Train" – 3:36
 "Werewolf" (Robert W. McPherson) – 4:27
 "Reflective Silence" – 5:20
 "Seems So Long" (Stevie Wonder) – 3:53
 "Gypsy Man" – 5:23
 "Melodie Chinoise" – 5:46
 "I've Got Dreams to Remember" (Otis Redding, Zelma Redding) – 6:15

Personnel 
Robin Kenyatta – alto saxophone, soprano saxophone, flute
Pat Rebillot, George Butcher – piano, organ
Larry Willis – electric piano
Keith Loving, Skip Pitts, David Spinozza, Jimmy Wood – guitar 
Stanley Clarke – bass, electric bass
Billy Cobham, Charles Collins, Ray Lucas, Rick Marotta – drums
Ralph MacDonald – percussion
Al Deville – trumpet (track 6) 
George Patterson, Jack Philpot, Seldon Powell – saxophone (track 6) 
Don Belamy (track 1), Lalome Washburn (track 5) – vocals

References 

1973 albums
Atlantic Records albums
Robin Kenyatta albums
Albums produced by Michael Cuscuna